The Lake Echo Power Station is a conventional hydroelectric power station located in the Central Highlands region of Tasmania, Australia. The power station is situated on the Upper River Derwent catchment and is owned and operated by Hydro Tasmania.

Technical details
Part of the Derwent scheme that comprises eleven hydroelectric power stations, the Lake Echo Power Station is the first station on the Dee River section of the scheme. The power station is located aboveground on the shores of the Dee Lagoon formed below Lake Echo on the Dee River. Water is diverted from Lake Echo by a single -long flume and -long canal. It then descends  through a single steel penstock to the station with a surge tower located midway along the penstock.

The station building houses a single alternator and the turbine has a fully embedded spiral casing and water flow is controlled via a straight flow main inlet valve and a relief valve designed to prevent spiral casing overpressure. The station output, estimated to be  annually, is fed to TasNetworks' transmission grid via an 11 kV/110 kV three-phase English Electric generator transformer to the outdoor switchyard.

Lake Echo is one of the main headwater storages for the Dee Lagoon, Bradys, Binney, Tungatinah Lagoon and the Lower River Derwent catchments, releasing water to a further seven stations downstream.

See also 

List of power stations in Tasmania

References

External links
Hydro Tasmania page on the Lower Derwent

Energy infrastructure completed in 1956
Hydroelectric power stations in Tasmania
Central Highlands (Tasmania)